Yamagata Girls Farm ( Yamagata Gāruzu Nōjō) is an agricultural organization in the city of Murayama in Yamagata Prefecture, Japan, whose goal is to promote agriculture work amongst young women.

Description

As of 2014, Yamagata Girls Farm had seven members in their 20s and 30s, all of whom held agriculture degrees, though the farm does not require members to hold a degree. They grew watermelon, spinach, taro, and five kinds of rice, from which they also made baked goods to sell. The farm sells its products online and through restaurants and hotels.

Background

As of 2011, agriculture made up 1.2% of Japan's GDP and provided 39% of Japan's food self-sufficiency.  Food self-sufficiency was 73% in 1965 and steeply declined as government promotion of manufactured goods led to rapid urbanization and an aging rural population who increasingly had to supplement their incomes with outside work.  Young people have tended to avoid agricultural work due to stereotypes of it being laborious and biased against women.  Faced with an aging population reliant on food imports has prompted the Japanese government to invest in agriculture and to raise awareness of women's rights in farming, such as the rights to land ownership and income.

History

Nahoko Takahashi returned to her parents' home after graduating from Yokohama National University.  Her father was a farmer whom she had helped while growing up.  She developed a determination to revitalize Japanese agriculture and founded Yamagata Girls Farm as a corporation employing women in agricultural work, as there were few farms in Japan that welcomed female workers.

As of 2014 Yamagata Girls Farm had yet to turn a profit.  The farm was focusing on rice grown with organic methods as a main source of income.

See also 
 Women in agriculture in Japan

Notes

References

Works cited

 
 
 

Agriculture in Japan
Women in agriculture
Women in Japan